Cherry Lane Shopping Centre is a  enclosed shopping mall located in Penticton, British Columbia, Canada. Prior to opening in 1975, a contest was held in which to decide upon a name for the new shopping centre. Many submissions were received and the present name was selected.  Cherry Lane showcases a good mix of retail tenants and services, including the anchor stores, London Drugs, Save-On-Foods, and Hudson's Bay.  It is the only enclosed shopping centre in the South Okanagan and Similkameen Valley.

References 

Buildings and structures in Penticton
Shopping malls in the Okanagan
Shopping malls established in 1975